Broadwaters is an electoral ward in Kidderminster, Worcestershire, England. The ward elects three councillors to both Wyre Forest District Council and Kidderminster Town Council.

Governance 
Broadwaters is in the parliamentary constituency of Wyre Forest. Three councillors serve the ward:

 Mary Rayner (Independent)
 Peter Young (Health Concern)
 Sarah Rook (Labour - Group leader)

References 

Kidderminster
Wards of Worcestershire